is a Japanese footballer currently playing as a defender for Tokyo Verdy.

Career statistics

Club
.

Notes

References

2002 births
Living people
Japanese footballers
Japan youth international footballers
Association football defenders
J3 League players
Tokyo Verdy players
Fujieda MYFC players